Anatol Usatîi (born 21 July 1976) is a Moldovan politician. He served as Minister of Economy and Infrastructure from 9 November 2020 to 31 December 2020 in the cabinet of Prime Minister Ion Chicu. He also served in this position in the same cabinet from 14 November 2019 to 16 March 2020.

References 

Living people
1976 births
Place of birth missing (living people)
Moldovan Ministers of Economy
21st-century Moldovan politicians